Sharon Negele is an American politician from Indiana. Negele is a Republican member of the Indiana House of Representatives from House District 13.

Early life 
Negele was born in Michigan.

Education 
In 1982, Negele earned a Bachelor of Arts degree in Finance and Economics from Western Michigan University. In 1990, Negele earned an MBA degree in finance from the University of Houston.

Career 
Negele is a small business owner.

On November 6, 2012, Negele won the election and became a Republican member of Indiana House of Representatives for District 13. Negele defeated Dan Young. On November 4, 2014, as an incumbent, Negele won the election unopposed and continued serving District 13.

Personal life 
Negele's husband is Dennis McIntosh. They have two children. Negele and her family live in Attica, Indiana.

References

External links 
Indiana House bio of Negele
http://www.sharonnegele.com/
http://ballotpedia.org/Sharon_Negele

Living people
Republican Party members of the Indiana House of Representatives
Western Michigan University alumni
University of Houston alumni
Women state legislators in Indiana
Year of birth missing (living people)
21st-century American politicians
21st-century American women politicians